Konadu Yiadom (born 10 June 2000) is a Ghanaian professional footballer who plays as defender for Ghanaian Premier League side West African Football Academy.

Career

Early career 
Yiadom started his career with lower-tier side Tema United, in the harbor city of Tema in the Greater Accra Region of Ghana before joining WAFA in 2018.

WAFA 
In January 2018, Yiadom joined West African Football Academy on a three-year deal after Ibrahim Abukari suffered an injury and was immediately promoted into the senior team. He made his debut on 2 May 2018, in a 2–1 victory to Berekum Chelsea. He made 5 league appearances in his debut season. The next season, the 2019 GFA Normalization Special Competition, he played 7 out of 12 league matches. The following season, the 2019–20 season, he played in 14 league matches and scored 2 goals before the league was suspended and later halted due to restrictions from the outbreak of the COVID-19 pandemic in Ghana.

References

External links 

 
 

2000 births
Living people
Association football defenders
Ghanaian footballers
West African Football Academy players
Ghana Premier League players
Ghana A' international footballers
2022 African Nations Championship players